St. Peter's is an independent brewery founded in 1996 by John Murphy in former agricultural buildings adjacent to St. Peter’s Hall in St Peter, South Elmham, near Bungay in the English county of Suffolk.

The brewery produces cask ales, but is best known for its cold-filtered bottled beers. The oval shape of its signatory 500 ml bottle is based on an 18th-century gin bottle from Gibbstown, by the Delaware River near Philadelphia, but a round version is also common.

The brewery also owns The Jerusalem Tavern, a pub in Clerkenwell, London.

The beers 

The brewery produces around twelve regular beers plus another six seasonal. St Peter's is known for its organic beers. A gluten free beer, G-Free TM was launched late in 2007 and is approved and licensed by Coeliac UK.

Awards 

 St. Peter's Organic Ale was awarded the Soil Associations Silver Medal in the drinks category in their Organic Food Awards 2006.
 In November 2007, the Independent newspaper conducted a blind tasting by a panel of judges of bottled beers and lagers to create a 'Top 50 beers' list and St. Peter's India Pale Ale was voted overall winner.
 Cream Stout was voted one of the Top 50 beers in the world in 2006 and has won the International Beer Competition, Porters and Stouts category, in 2006, 2004 and 2003.
 The cask version of Old Style Porter won the Campaign for Real Ale (CAMRA) Champion Beer of Suffolk in 2005 and took bronze in the CAMRA Winter Beer Festival held in Manchester in January 2007.
 St. Peter's Grapefruit Fruit Beer won a bronze medal in Speciality Beer Category at the Great British Beer Festival in August 2007.

Notes

External links 

 
 RateBeer

Companies based in Suffolk
Breweries in England
British companies established in 1996
Food and drink companies established in 1996
1996 establishments in England
Waveney District